Plaza Perangsang is a major landmark in Shah Alam, Selangor, Malaysia. Located at Persiaran Perbandaran near Wisma MBSA it houses several commercial facilities and hotels and is three of the earliest skyscrapers in the city behind the Sultan Salahuddin Abdul Aziz Shah Building and Wisma MBSA. It was opened in 1988. Quality Hotel (formerly Holiday Inn Shah Alam) is the earliest hotel in Shah Alam.

Occupants in the Plaza Perangsang
Quality Hotel, Shah Alam (will cease operation by June 2014)
Headquarters of the Kumpulan Darul Ehsan Berhad (KDEB) and Kumpulan Perangsang Selangor Berhad (KPSB)
Lembaga Hasil Dalam Negeri (LHDN) Selangor branch

References

Shah Alam
Skyscraper office buildings in Malaysia
Skyscraper hotels in Malaysia
Buildings and structures in Selangor
Office buildings completed in 1987
1987 establishments in Malaysia
20th-century architecture in Malaysia